Ronald John Yates, AM (died 25 October 2012), was a former CEO of Qantas (retired 1986) and a Member of the Order of Australia. He was also the "Vice President – Australasia & Chair of Safety Awards Committee" at the International Federation of Airworthiness.

Yates graduated from the University of Sydney in 1944.

Bibliography 
 Qantas and the 707 - paper by Yates

See also
Australian Civil Aviation Safety Authority
International Civil Aviation Organization

References 

https://web.archive.org/web/20060915095532/http://www.usyd.edu.au/senate/committees/advisoryYates.shtml 
http://www.ifairworthy.com/contact.php

External links 
 Obituary

Members of the Order of Australia
2012 deaths
Year of birth missing
University of Sydney alumni